Koghb may refer to:
 Koghb, Armenia
 Tuzluca, Turkey